Les Thomas (28 May 1906 – 13 August 1997) was a former Australian rules footballer who played with Collingwood in the Victorian Football League (VFL).

Notes

External links 

Les Thomas's profile at Collingwood Forever

1906 births
1997 deaths
Australian rules footballers from South Australia
Collingwood Football Club players
West Adelaide Football Club players
Sturt Football Club players